Isabel Rosales Pareja (March 1, 1895 – April 8, 1961) was an Ecuadorian piano prodigy who studied in France, a student of Alfred Cortot.

Biography
Isabel Rosales Pareja was born in Guayaquil on March 1, 1895, the daughter of cocoa farm owners Josefina Pareja Avilés and Carlos Rosales Llaguno.

She studied music in France, standing out as a piano prodigy. She was a student of the Franco-Swiss pianist and conductor Alfred Cortot, and won the first piano prize at the Conservatoire de Paris. She gave recitals and concerts in France and Ecuador. She became known as one of the "Three Muses of Guayaquil", along with her sisters, painter Leonor Rosales and ballet dancer Thalie Rosales.

Personal life
She married Gonzalo Zaldumbide, a Quito writer and diplomat. The couple had a daughter, pianist Celia Zaldumbide Rosales, who established the Zaldumbide-Rosales Foundation in her honor.

Isabel Rosales Pareja died in Quito on April 8, 1961.

References

1895 births
1961 deaths
20th-century Ecuadorian educators
Conservatoire de Paris alumni
Ecuadorian classical musicians
Ecuadorian pianists
People from Guayaquil
Women music educators
20th-century women educators